The River Lathkill is a river in the Peak District National Park in Derbyshire,  England.

First recorded in 1280, the name "Lathkill"  possibly has Scandinavian roots, the old Norse hlada-kill translating as "narrow valley with a barn".

Course

In times of high rainfall the source of the river is Lathkill Head Cave, but in normal conditions the river rises from springs slightly further down the Lathkill Dale valley,  close to the village of Monyash, west of Bakewell, and flows generally eastward past the village of Over Haddon and through the village of Alport (where it is joined by the River Bradford) until it meets the River Wye near Rowsley. Roughly six and a half miles from source to outfall, it is the only river in the district that flows over limestone for its entire length.

The medieval Conksbury Bridge now carries the road from Bakewell to Youlgreave.

History
The dale has a history of lead mining, and among the trees on the north side of the valley are the remains of the 19th-century Mandale Mine, including an old aqueduct and the ruined pump house, used as one of the last attempts to keep the mines drained and workable.

The water in the river is often clear, and Charles Cotton wrote in The Compleat Angler that it is:

Indeed, when the river is at its clearest the fish can be seen from one bank across to the other.

The river valley, known as Lathkill Dale, is popular with tourists who visit for its natural environment and wildlife.

Much of the river itself, and sections of the river valley, fall within the Derbyshire Dales National Nature Reserve and the Lathkill and Upper Lathkill SSSIs. Among the species that thrive there are  brown trout, dipper, and the rare wild plant Jacob's ladder.

Through the use of Bluetooth, it is now possible at particular locations in the nature reserve for visitors to download pictures of flowers and birds, and also examples of birdsong, onto their mobile phones.

The dale was used as a filming location for The Princess Bride.

Access
There are car parks at Over Haddon, Moor Lane, Youlgrave and Conksbury Bridge, and bus services run from Over Haddon, Monyash and Youlgreave.

See also
River Dove
Rivers of the United Kingdom
Derbyshire lead mining history

References

External links
Geology Trail leaflet (.pdf)

Rivers of Derbyshire
Sites of Special Scientific Interest in Derbyshire
Rivers and valleys of the Peak District
2Lathkill